Pseudhomelix ornata is a species of beetle in the family Cerambycidae, and the only species in the genus Pseudhomelix. It was described by Quedenfeldt in 1855.

References

Phrynetini
Beetles described in 1855